Wennersgaard Point is a point forming the northwest extremity of Svilengrad Peninsula on Davis Coast, the west coast of Graham Land in Antarctica. It is situated on both the east side of the entrance to Lanchester Bay and its sub-embayment Hvoyna Cove, and the southwest side of the entrance to Jordanoff Bay . First charted by the Swedish Antarctic Expedition in Nov.-Dec. 1902 and named after Ole C. Wennersgaard, a seaman of the expedition who died while wintering on Paulet Island in 1903.

Headlands of Graham Land
Davis Coast